This is a list of European nations sorted by their Gross Domestic Product (GDP), the value of all final goods and services produced within a nation in a given year. The GDP dollar estimates presented here are derived from purchasing power parity (PPP) calculations for the latest years recorded in the CIA World Factbook. The list includes all members of the Council of Europe, Belarus and Kosovo. The figures provided are all quoted in US dollars.

Gross Domestic Product

GDP (PPP) by country in 2017 (in billions of USD)

See also
List of European countries by GNI (nominal) per capita
Economy of Europe
European Union

References

Europe
GDP (PPP)
Economy of Europe-related lists